Callum O'Brien (born 4 November 1982) is a New Zealand professional squash player. He reached a career high of 61 in the world.  He represented his country in the Commonwealth Games in 2006

References

1982 births
Living people
New Zealand male squash players
Squash players at the 2006 Commonwealth Games
Commonwealth Games competitors for New Zealand